Van Niekerk is an Afrikaans surname. Notable people with the surname include:

 Barend van Niekerk (1939–1981), South African lawyer and academic
 Dane van Niekerk (born 1993), South African cricketer
 Dennis van Niekerk (born 1984), South African cyclist
 Dewald van Niekerk (born 1997), South African squash player
 Janro van Niekerk (born 1982), South African rugby union player
 Joe van Niekerk (born 1980), South African rugby union player
 Kraai van Niekerk (born 1938), South African politician
 Marlene van Niekerk (born 1954), South African writer
 Martin van Niekerk (born 1989), Namibian cricketer
 Wayde van Niekerk (born 1992), South African sprinter

Afrikaans-language surnames
Surnames of Dutch origin